A helmet is a form of protective gear worn to protect the head. More specifically, a helmet complements the skull in protecting the human brain. Ceremonial or symbolic helmets (e.g., a policeman's helmet in the United Kingdom) without protective function are sometimes worn. Soldiers wear combat helmets, often made from Kevlar or other lightweight synthetic fibers.

The word helmet is derived from helm, an Old English word for a protective head covering.

Helmets are used for recreational activities and sports (e.g., jockeys in horse racing, American football, ice hockey, cricket, baseball, camogie, hurling and rock climbing); dangerous work activities such as construction, mining, riot police, military aviation, and in transportation (e.g. motorcycle helmets and bicycle helmets). Since the 1990s, most helmets are made from resin or plastic, which may be reinforced with fibers such as aramids.

Designs
Some British gamekeepers during the 18th and 19th centuries wore helmets made of straw bound together with cut bramble. Europeans in the tropics often wore the pith helmet, developed in the mid-19th century and made of pith or cork.

Military applications in the 19th–20th centuries saw a number of leather helmets, particularly among aviators and tank crews in the early 20th century. In the early days of the automobile, some motorists also adopted this style of headgear, and early football helmets were also made of leather.  In World War II, American, Soviet, German, Italian and French flight crews wore leather helmets, the German pilots disguising theirs under a beret before disposing of both and switching to cloth caps. The era of the First and Second World Wars also saw a resurgence of metal military helmets, most notably the Brodie helmet and the Stahlhelm.

Modern helmets have a much wider range of applications, including helmets adapted to the specific needs of many athletic pursuits and work environments, and these helmets very often incorporate plastics and other synthetic materials for their light weight and shock absorption capabilities.  Some types of synthetic fibers used to make helmets in the 21st century include aramid fibers, such as Kevlar and Twaron. Race car helmets include a head and neck support system that keeps the helmet (and head) attached to the body in severe collisions.

Helmet types

Helmets of many different types have developed over time.  Most early helmets had military uses, though some may have had more ceremonial than combat applications.

Two important helmet types to develop in antiquity were the Corinthian helmet and the Roman galea.

During the Middle Ages, many different military helmets and some ceremonial helmets were developed, almost all being metal.  Some of the more important medieval developments included the great helm, the bascinet, the frog-mouth helm, and the armet.

The great seal of Owain Glyndŵr (c. 1359 – c. 1415) depicts the prince of Wales & his stallion wearing full armour, they both wear protective headgear with Owain's gold dragon mounted on top. This would have been impractical in battle, so therefore these would have been ceremonial.

In the 19th century, more materials were incorporated, namely leather, felt and pith.  The pith helmet and the leather pickelhaube were important 19th century developments.  The greatest expansion in the variety of forms and composition of helmets, however, took place in the 20th century, with the development of highly specialized helmets for a multitude of athletic and professional applications, as well as the advent of modern plastics.  During World War I, the French army developed the Adrian helmet, the British developed the Brodie helmet, and the Germans produced the Stahlhelm.

Flight helmets were also developed throughout the 20th century.  A multitude of athletic helmets, including football helmets, batting helmets, hockey helmets, cricket helmets, bicycle helmets, motorcycle helmets and racing helmets, were also developed in the 20th century.

Helmets since the mid-20th century have often incorporated lightweight plastics and other synthetic materials, and their use has become highly specialized.  Some important recent developments include the French SPECTRA helmet, Spanish MARTE helmet or the American PASGT (commonly called "Kevlar" by U.S. troops) and Advanced Combat Helmet, or ACH.

Also sports helmets like ski-helmets.

Heraldry

As the coat of arms was originally designed to distinguish noble combatants on the battlefield or in a tournament, even while covered in armour, it is not surprising that heraldic elements constantly incorporated the shield and the helmet, these often being the most visible parts of a knight's military equipment.

The practice of indicating peerage through the display of barred or grilled helmets first appeared around 1587-1615, and the heraldic convention of displaying helmets of rank in the United Kingdom, which came into vogue around Stuart times, is as follows:
Sovereign: a gold barred-face (tournament) helm placed affronté
Peer's helmet: silver barred-face (tournament) helm placed in profile
Knight's or baronet's helmet: steel helm (earlier jousting helm, later close helm) placed affronté with visor open
Esquire's helmet: steel helm placed in profile with visor closed

Earlier rolls of arms reveal, however, that early heraldic helmets were depicted in a manner faithful to the styles in actual military or tournament use at the time.

Gallery

See also

 Combat helmet
 List of combat helmets
 Face shield
 Firefighter's helmet
 God helmet
 Helmet boxing
 The Stackhat
 Riot helmet

References

External links

 "Helmets...A Medieval Note In Modern Warfare", August 1942, Popular Science evolution of military helmets

Canoeing and kayaking equipment
Headgear
Hurling equipment
Safety